Bharariwal is a village in the Amritsar District of Punjab and was famous for its cultivation of vegetables, especially Gobhi (Cauliflower) and Celery (ਕਰਨੌਲੀ) and is also famous for wheat and having the first grain elevator in Amritsar. The village is on the outskirts of city where a sacred pool was built that had been worshipped for thousands of years by locals upon which the Golden Temple was built on the Chabaal Road. The majority of its inhabitants belong to the Samra clan of Jatts though the name may come from the Brar clan with whom they joined forces upon reaching the village in the 14th century.

Bharariwal falls in Amritsar (Central) Assembly constituency and is 4 km away from the Golden Temple. Bharariwal and its surroundings (which includes the villages of Anngarh and Fatehpur) were outside the old city walls but have now been incorporated into the city of Amritsar.

Government
Bharariwal was a part of the Sikh Confederacy Misls and the Sarpanch of the village when the system was implemented was Hazara Singh Samra Sindhwale (a wealthy landlord from Sindh where the Samra clan had large holdings at Umarkot who migrated to his father's ancestral village Bharariwal after partition in 1947). After his death, the office of Sarpanch remained in his family for a long period, and eventually the village was incorporated within the limits of Municipal Corporation of Amritsar in 1974 and the institution of Panchayat was abolished.
The Municipal Councillor of this area at present is Sh. Vikas Soni and the concerned MLA (representing Amritsar Central constituency) is Om Prakash Soni of the Indian National Congress.

Notable people
Major General Kamaljit Singh Samra of the Indian army, Surjit Singh Samra (Director of Agriculture, Madhya Pradesh), Jaswinder Singh Samra (Secretary, Punjab Pradesh Congress Committee), Harpal Singh Samra and Balvinder Singh Samra (Chaudher) come from Bharariwal.

Villages in Amritsar district